Majdelyoun is a town in Southern Lebanon located  from Beirut and  east of Sidon at an elevation of  above sea level. Majdelyoun occupies .
The village is bordered to the east by Salhieh and Kfarjarra, to the west by Haret Saida, top the north by Salhieh and Abra, and to the south by Ayn Ed Delb and Krayye.

Etymology

The origin of the name Majdelyoun may refer to a Syriac word meaning: "guard tower,"  "the castle," or "small tower." While the exact date of the town's founding is not known, it is believed to have been inhabited since ancient times. Alternatively, the name may originate in a tale told by an old man called Tanios Fakhoury. He said that the name of the town is related to a person named Leon, who had great glory (majd مجد in Arabic) days with the French and earlier, and most likely lived in the town that led to Majdelyoun’s name (Majd al-Krum and Lyon). It is also said that Maryum Majdelyoun was an important Christian woman who hailed from the same town. According to a local legend, she perfumed the hair of Jesus Christ before his supposed crucifixion.

History
In 1838, Eli Smith noted  Mejdeluneh, as a village located "North of et-Tuffah, next the coast".

In 1875, Victor Guérin travelled in the area, and noted "a mound, which is crowned by the small village of Medjdel Youn. It contains barely 120 inhabitants, Maronites or United Greeks."

Organization
Majdelyoun is famous for its palacesamong them Rafik Hariri’s palaceand villas that are integrated with lush vegetation to make a distinctive town, half of which is green. It is divided by three parallel streets. The town has been divided into two regions: the lower region is for residential buildings and the higher region is for luxury villas.

Demographics

Majdelyoun has a mixed population of Muslims and Christians. The town has 1,500 residents on its electoral roll and about 3,500 people are registered there in accordance with the electoral restrictions. Registered residents are 4% Muslim (Sunni and Shiaa), and 96% Christian of all denominations.

The town has more than 10,000 actual residents.

Economy and education

Majdelyoun was famous in ancient times for olive cultivation, but the circumstances have changed in the recent past. Today the town confines its business to some shops which began to grow steadily, especially on the highway, and contribute to the growth of the local economy. The town is lacking public and private establishments and has no  schools or hospitals. It has one Catholic church and two mosques.

Climate
Majdelyoun has marked temperate changes between winters and summers. The temperatures do not vary significantly between day and night. Frosts can occur in winter; January is commonly the coldest month of the year. September is on average the month with most sunshine. Rainfall and other precipitation peaks around December. June is normally the driest month.

Gallery

References

Bibliography

 
 

Populated places in Sidon District
Shia Muslim communities in Lebanon